Li Jiancheng (born December 1964) is a Chinese engineer who is a professor and vice-president of Wuhan University. He is an academician of the Chinese Academy of Engineering. He is a member of the Communist Party of China.

Biography
Li was born in Ulanqab, Inner Mongolia, in December 1964. He earned a bachelor's degree in 1987, a master's degree in 1990, and a doctor's degree in 1993, all from Wuhan University of Surveying and Mapping Technology (now School of Geodesy and Geomatics, Wuhan University). After graduation, he taught at the university, where he was appointed vice-president in January 2015. In November 2011, at the age of 46, he was elected an academician of the Chinese Academy of Engineering , becoming the youngest academician in that year. In September 2022, he succeeded  as president of Central South University.

Honours and awards
 November 2011 Member of the Chinese Academy of Engineering (CAE)
 October 21, 2016 Science and Technology Progress Award of the Ho Leung Ho Lee Foundation
 January 10, 2020 State Science and Technology Progress Award (First Class)

References

1964 births
Living people
People from Ulanqab
Engineers from Inner Mongolia
Wuhan University alumni
Academic staff of Wuhan University
Members of the Chinese Academy of Engineering